"Hit and Run" is a pop song written by Joe Camilleri, Jeff Burstin and Tony Faehse and recorded by Australian blues, rock and R&B band Jo Jo Zep & The Falcons. The song was the first on the Mushroom Records label, released in July 1979 as the lead single from the band's fourth studio album Screaming Targets (1979).

The song peaked at number 12 on the Kent Music Report in Australia, becoming the band's first top 20 single. 
It was also the band's first single to be released in USA via Columbia Records.

Track listing 
7" (K 7525) 
Side A – "Hit and Run" - 3:30
Side B – "Not A Woman, Not A Child" - 3:34

7" (USA)' (11319)
Side A – "Hit and Run" - 3:19
Side B1 "Nosey Parker" - 3:16
Side B1 "Thin Line" - 3:22

Charts

Weekly charts

Year-end charts

References 

1979 songs
1979 singles
Mushroom Records singles
Songs written by Joe Camilleri
Jo Jo Zep & The Falcons songs